Rajpur tehsil is a fourth-order administrative and revenue division, a subdivision of third-order administrative and revenue division of Barwani district of Madhya Pradesh.

Geography
Rajpur tehsil has an area of 715.01 sq kilometers. It is bounded by Barwani tehsil in the southwest, west and northwest, Anjad tehsil in the north, Thikri tehsil in the northeast, Khargone district in the east and southeast and Sendhwa tehsil in the south.

See also 
Barwani district

Citations

External links

Tehsils of Madhya Pradesh
Barwani district